Way Over Me is a Canadian television drama series, which premiered May 7, 2021 on Crave and Super Écran. Created by Sophie Lorain and Alexis Durand-Brault, it is the first French-language series ever to be marketed as a Crave original production.

A psychological thriller, the series stars Pascale Bussières as Dr. Justine Mathieu, an emergency room psychiatrist who becomes strongly attracted to, and initiates a relationship with, David Ducharme (Vincent Leclerc) after he is brought into the hospital while suffering a bipolar episode. The show also focuses on Clara St-Amand (Lorain), Myriam Melançon (Sandra Dumaresq) and Gabriel Beauregard (Bruno Marcil), the three emergency first responders she works with. The cast also includes Émile Proulx-Cloutier, Valérie Blais, Danielle Proulx and Émile Schneider in supporting roles.

The series airs in its original French-language form on Super Écran, while both subtitled and dubbed versions are available on Crave for anglophone audiences.

The series uses a cover of Daniel Bélanger's song "Sortez-moi de moi", from his 1996 album Quatre saisons dans le désordre, as its theme music.

References

2020s Canadian drama television series
2021 Canadian television series debuts
Canadian thriller television series
Crave original programming